Dureji is an administrative subdivision (tehsil) of Lasbela District in the Balochistan province of Pakistan. The tehsil is administratively subdivided into two Union Councils and is headquartered at the town of Dureji.

References

Tehsils of Lasbela District